Helen Logan (December 13, 1906 – January 15, 1989) was an American screenwriter active from 1935 to 1950.

Biography 
Helen Logan was born in Los Angeles, California, to William Edson Logan and Ida Jane Busick. She attended the University of California at Los Angeles and then went to work at Fox as a script reader before moving up the ranks to be a script clerk. Eventually she began writing her own screenplays for Fox, working on two popular franchises, Charlie Chan and the Jones Family. Later she worked on wartime musical films.

She wrote many of her scripts in collaboration with writer-director-actor Robert Ellis, who she began working with around 1934 and married at some point after 1940. In fact, in 1938, Ellis was sued by actress Vera Reynolds for $150,000; Reynolds alleged that Ellis had promised to marry her but instead took a trip to Mexico with Logan. Ellis and Logan had separate contracts but made the same salary.

Selected filmography
 Charlie Chan in Egypt (1935)
 Ladies Love Danger (1935)
 Back to Nature (1936)
 Red Lights Ahead (1936)
 Footlights and Shadows (1936)
 Charlie Chan's Secret (1936)
 Charlie Chan at the Circus (1936) 
 Charlie Chan at the Race Track (1936)
 Charlie Chan at the Olympics (1937)
 The Jones Family in Big Business (1937)
 A Trip to Paris (1938)
 Charlie Chan in City in Darkness (1939)
 The Man Who Wouldn't Talk (1940)
 Sun Valley Serenade (1941)
 Iceland (1942)
 Hello, Frisco, Hello (1943)
 Pin Up Girl (1944)
 Something for the Boys (1944)
 Four Jills in a Jeep (1944)

References

Bibliography
 Solomon, Aubrey. The Fox Film Corporation, 1915-1935: A History and Filmography. McFarland, 2011.

External links

1906 births
1989 deaths
American women screenwriters
20th-century American women writers
20th-century American screenwriters
Screenwriters from California
Writers from Los Angeles
University of California, Los Angeles alumni